Pierre Szekely (11 June 1923) was a Hungarian sculptor, architect and educator. In the 1940s, after surviving the holocaust, Szekely became a resident of France, and eventually became an avante garde architect and international lecturer of art philosophy.

Early life
Szekely was a student of Hanna Dallos. After being interned in a Nazi concentration camp, he escaped to France in 1946, where by the 1950s he had developed a reputation for sculpture and architecture.

In 1975, Szekely completed La Dame du Lac, which is an iconic climbing wall in the suburbs of Paris. The Dame du Lac is considered to have played an instrumental role in the development of Parkour by David Belle, made famous by early montages such as Speed Air Man (1997).

1923 births
2001 deaths
Hungarian sculptors
20th-century sculptors